Bielski is a Polish spelling of the Slavic surname Belsky. The Lithuanized form is Bielskis/Bielskiene/Bielskytė, Latvian: Beslkis.

Notable people with the surname include:

World War II partisans
 Bielski partisans , a World War II Jewish partisan group in German-occupied Poland led by four brothers:
 Tuvia Bielski (1906–1987), a Jewish partisan of the Second World War and leader of the Bielski partisans; oldest of the four brothers
 Asael Bielski (1908–1945), second oldest of the four brothers
 Alexander Zeisal Bielski (nicknamed "Zus") (1912–1995), second youngest of the four brothers
 Aron Bielski (born 1927), youngest of the four brothers

Media about the partisans
 The Bielski Brothers (book), a biography of the Bielski partisans written by Peter Duffy
 Defiance (2008 film), a film adaptation of Nechama Tec's eponymous book
Defiance: The Bielski Partisans, a book about the Bielski partisans written by Nechama Tec

Others
 Adi Bielski (born 1982), Israeli theatre and film actress
 Joan Bielski, (1923–2012), Australian activist
 Marcin Bielski (1495–1575), a Polish chronicler of the 16th Century
 Monika Bielskyte (born 1986), Lithuanian-born creative and futurologist
 Ze'ev Bielski (born 1949), Israeli Knesset Member and former chairman of the Jewish Agency for Israel
 Dick Bielski (born 1932), American NFL football professional player and coach

See also 
Bielsk County, in Podlaskie Voivodeship (north-east Poland)
Bielsko County, in Silesian Voivodeship (south Poland), the county seat being Bielsko-Biała
 Belsky (surname)

Polish-language surnames